is the debut studio album by Japanese drummer and singer Kavka Shishido, released on September 9, 2013.

Background and development 
Shishido had been working as a musician since 2004, when she debuted as a drummer in the band The News as their third drummer. In 2005, Shishido started collaborating with The High-Lows' drummer Kenji Ohshima and Uverworld producer Satoru Hiraide, and made a band called Eddy12 together. During this period, Shishido started to perform in her signature style, performing the drums and singing simultaneously. While in Eddy12, Shishido was scouted by a record company for her to debut as a solo musician. She was scouted before she started performing the drums as part of her act, but added them back in during discussions for how to set her apart from other musicians. She left The News in 2009, however continued to work with her Eddy12 bandmates who act as producers. She debuted under Imperial Records with the digital single "Day Dream Rider" in May 2012.

Writing and production 
Album production for the songs not found on singles began in mid June, and lasted until the end of July. The album was created in collaboration with Satoru Hiraide and Kenji Ohshima. Shishido served as the primary lyricist for the project. The album's title, Kavkanize is a portmanteau of "Kavka" and "organize", because she and her staff felt as if they had organized an amusement park in making the album.

Shishido wanted to use one B-side from each of her singles, as she felt that she had not released any throwaway songs. The first song chosen for the album was the pop-rock "Love Corrida", which was recorded so that Shishido could expand her musical range. "Love Corrida" served as the basis for inspiration for the rest of the songs recorded for the album. The lyrics of the song were written together with singer and DJ Silva, who Shishido met through a friend. The pair wrote the song by email. "Futatsu no Taiyō" was written by Akiko Noma, formerly of the band GO!GO!7188, who was a contact of Ohshima's. Several songs were much older, such as "Gunjō" which was from before her debut. "Engine", "Shinkaigyo" and "Tobenai Tori" were all songs that Shishido had performed at live concerts, however "Tobenai Tori" was completely rewritten and retitled for the album.

"The Outsiders" is the first song sung entirely in English by Shishido, even though she does not consider herself an English speaker. When creating the song, producer Ohshima was inspired to add a rap section. The director who introduced Silva to Shishido knew rapper Dohzi-T, who agreed to appear as he thought rapping on top of a rock sound would be interesting as he'd never done something like that before.

Album jacket 
The standard edition cover depicts Shishido with crow feathers in her hair, while the limited edition version features a crow with a long, black wig in the style of Shishido's hair. The pictures were shot by photographer Itaru Hirama, and the photo shoot was intended as a self-introduction, due to Shishido being associated with crows.

Promotion and release 
The song "Kiken na Futari" was used as the opening theme song for the drama Doubles: Futari no Keiji, while "Day Dream Rider" was used as the ending theme song for the TV Tokyo variety show Fes Iwao. Prior to the release of the album, a video was released for the song "Love Corrida", which served as the leading promotional track on the album. It was released as a preceding download on August 7, 2013.

In February 2014, Shishido held her first Japanese tour, after releasing her next single "Wagamama" / "Miss. Miss Me". In July, Shishido released the digital single "Dame Kashira?". The song's visuals featured a very different image of Shishido, showing her in a more girly style, while the musiv video featured her dancing.

In September, it was announced that Shishido had switched labels to the newly created Justa Music, a sub-label of Avex Group, and would star in the second series of Erika Sawajiri fashion drama First Class. Her first release under the label was the song "Don't Be Love" featuring veteran singer-songwriter Kazuyoshi Saito, and will be used as the theme song of the 2015 Fuji Television drama Isha-tachi no Ren'ai Jijō. This song also serves as the leading track from K5, a special extended play where Shishido collaborated with five different musicians, released in June 2015.

Imperial Records announced that Kavkanize would be re-released in July 2015, compiling the singles released after Kavkanize, as well as all of Shishido's Imperial-era music videos.

Critical reception 
CDJournal reviewers praised the album as elegant, and felt even though she was most talked about for her visual aspects, her "deep flavoured" vocals  and "rhythmic numbers" deserved praise. For the album's singles, they gave "Aisuru Kakugo" a star for high recommendation, calling it "impacting, first degree burn glam rock". They felt that "Music"'s lyrics were "numbing", and the melody "frantic", and that her "rock older sister" dress and singing style fitted "Kiken na Futari" perfectly.

Sayako Oku of Skream! noted the variety found on the album compared to her exclusively rock sound before the release, such as the "party tunes" "Love Corrida" and "Hyaku-nen Beer", and praised her vocals and drumming.

Track listing

Chart rankings

Sales and certifications

Release history

References 

2013 debut albums
Japanese-language albums